Taze may refer to:

 Taze, Myanmar, a town in Shwebo District, Sagaing Division, Myanmar
 Tazé, a railway station and restaurant in Indiana, Pennsylvania, US
 Della Taze, a character in the novel Wetware by Rudy Rucker
 Taze, a character in Ginga Sengoku Gun'yūden Rai
 The action of using a taser of a person or object
 Taze (rapper), British rapper

See also
 Taizé (disambiguation)
 Tase (disambiguation)
 Taser, a brand of electroshock weapon 
 Tays (disambiguation)
 Tazze, saucer-like dishes either mounted on a stem and foot or on a foot alone
 Teays (disambiguation)
 Tazo, a US tea distributor

Usage
 U.S English, "Stop or I will 'Taze' you".